Boil is a village in northeastern Bulgaria. It is located in the Dulovo Municipality, Silistra District. In 2011 it had a population of 890 inhabitants.

External links
Boil, Bulgaria, Geonames

Populated places on the Danube
Villages in Silistra Province